Viridomys is a genus of extinct mammal from the Upper Cretaceous of North America. It was a member of the extinct order of Multituberculata, and lived during the Mesozoic, also known as the "age of the dinosaurs." It's within the suborder of Cimolodonta, though its further affinities are unclear.

The primary species, Viridomys orbatus, is known from fossils found in Campanian (Upper Cretaceous)-aged strata of the Upper Milk River Formation in Alberta, Canada. Possible remains have also been found in Dogie Mountain, Texas (United States). The Texas site is believed to be Paleocene in age.

References 
 Fox (1971), "Early Campanian multituberculates (Mammalia: Allotheria) from the upper Milk River Formation, Alberta", Canadian Journal of Earth Sciences 8, p. 916-938.
 Kielan-Jaworowska, Z. & Hurum, J.H. (2001), "Phylogeny and Systematics of multituberculate mammals", Paleontology 44, p. 389-429.
 Much of this information has been derived from  Mesozoic Mammals: "basal" Cimolodonta, Cimolomyidae, Boffiidae and Kogaionidae, an Internet directory.

Cimolodonts
Late Cretaceous mammals of North America
Extinct mammals of North America
Late Cretaceous mammals
Milk River Formation
Prehistoric mammal genera